Charles Caryl Coleman (April 25, 1840 in Buffalo, New York – December 5, 1928 in Capri, Italy) was an American artist.

Early life
Coleman was born in Buffalo, New York to John Hull Coleman (1813) and Charlotte Augusta (née Caryl) Coleman.  His younger brother was Caryl Coleman (1847–1930), an ecclesiologist, church glass manufacturer and decorator who was educated at Bellevue Medical College and Canisius College, and who married Nonna Agnes Black. Caryl opened the church department of the Tiffany Company in New York in 1889 and operated it for 10 years. In 1899 he founded the Church Glass and Decorating Company of New York which manufactured a variety of decorative and stained-glass windows for various churches, academic institutions, and other private and public buildings.

His maternal grandparents were Capt. Benjamin Caryl and Susan Young. His paternal grandparents were Charles H. Coleman (1787–1880) and Doreas (née Hull) Coleman (1791–1822).  Charles was a descendant of Thomas Coleman of Marlborough, Wiltshire, England, who came to Boston in 1635 and moved to Nantucket in 1663 after living in Newbury, Massachusetts.

He was raised in Buffalo and studied art under William Holbrook Beard "and an itinerant painter, Andrew Andrews whose real name was Isaacs."

Career
Between 1859 and 1862, Coleman studied in Paris under Thomas Couture, returning during the American Civil War to serve with the Union Army during which he was seriously wounded in South Carolina and recovered in New York City. He returned to Europe in 1866 with fellow painters William Morris Hunt and Elihu Vedder. In 1865, he was elected into the National Academy of Design as an Associate Academician.

From 1863 to 1866, Coleman maintained a studio in New York. It was first at 840 and later at 896 Broadway. He regularly showed his work in the exhibitions of the Brooklyn Art Academy and the National Academy of Design in New York.

In 1866, he left America again and spent time painting in London, Paris, and Brittany. He then moved to a Roman apartment previously occupied by poet John Keats, living there from the late 1860s to the mid 1880s, before finally settling in Capri.

Coleman's decorative panels constitute his greatest contributions to nineteenth-century art. These paintings, which represent attenuated branches of flowering fruit trees or azaleas, can be compared only to the oversized stained glass panels of John La Farge and Louis Comfort Tiffany. Embodying all of the characteristics of the international aesthetic movement, they also depict Japanese fans, Chinese pots, maiolica vases, Venetian vases, Islamic tapestries, and Indian textiles.

In 1893, Coleman returned to the United States briefly.  While there, he was commissioned to paint and decorate the interiors of the New-York State Building at the Chicago World's Fair, along with fellow artists Frank D. Millet and Elmer E. Garnsey.

In 1899, Avery Galleries at 368 Fifth Avenue in New York held an exhibition with forty of his pictures and drawings.  Another was held there in 1902, featuring over fifty paintings and pastels made by Coleman.  The place of honor was given to his contribution to the 1901 Pan-American Exposition, held in his hometown of Buffalo, titled Saintly Dreams by Early Moonlight.  It was a saint with a solid golden halo, flowing black hair, a red gown, and a branch of red roses on her lap.  The New York Times stated that she "seems to have felt the languor and bewitchment of a Capri moonlight. She lounges on a white-tiled bench between round stucco columns, flowering shrubs in pots before her, and above her head a lattice running from pillar to pillar. Strong shadows fall about her from the moonlight, leaving her head in the shade."

Capri
In 1870, he converted the guesthouse of the former convent of Santa Teresa into Villa Narcissus.  A part of the villa was dedicated to a "palace of art" with antiquities and his own paintings.  Coleman, a friend of prominent Dr. Allan McLane Hamilton, a grandson of Treasury Secretary Alexander Hamilton, found Villa Narcissus, a villa near his, for Hamilton in 1894.

Villa Narcissus was later purchased from him by Rose O'Neill, his friend and also an American artist.  O'Neill permitted Coleman to live out the remainder of his days there, and he remained at the Villa until his death in 1928.

Personal life
In 1875, Coleman married Mary Edith Grey Alsager (d. 1906), who worked with the Red Cross during the Franco-Prussian War of 1870, treating both French and German soldiers.  They did not have any children and Mary predeceased him.

In his June 1916 will, he bequeathed all of his estate in a life trust fund for the benefit of his brother, Caryl Coleman (d. 1930).  The will further dictates that after his brother's death, the estate shall go to his friend, Mrs. Rose O'Neill Wilson, of Saugatuck, Connecticut.  In the event that Mrs. Wilson died before his brother, the property goes to Anita Vedder (1873–1954), the daughter of his friend Elihu Vedder of Capri. In the event all predeceased him, the estate would go to the American Academy in Rome.

Exhibitions
One-man exhibitions of his work were exhibited at:

 1899 - Avery Galleries, New York, New York
 1902 - Avery Galleries, New York, New York
 1906 - Thomas C. Hoe Gallery, New York, New York
 1907 - St. Botolph Club, Boston, Massachusetts
 1907 - John Herron Art Institute, Indianapolis, Indiana
 1907 - Detroit Institute of Arts, Detroit, Michigan
 1907 - Saint Louis City Art Museum, St. Louis, Missouri
 1907 - Buffalo Fine Arts Academy, Buffalo, New York
 1912 - Buffalo Fine Arts Academy, Buffalo, New York

Works
His work was exhibited in the United States and England, including:

 Early Morning-Capri, Albright-Knox Art Gallery
 The Antiquary, Albright-Knox Art Gallery
 The Capri Girl, Albright-Knox Art Gallery
 Oil Press, Anacapri-Capri, Albright-Knox Art Gallery
 In the Garden of Villa Castello, Albright-Knox Art Gallery
 Music in the Moonlight, Detroit Institute of Arts
 The Return from the Crucifixion, Brooklyn Museum
 Study of Elihu Vedder, Coleman's friend
 Portrait of Walter Savage Landor, a commission of the poet and essayist
 The Bronze Horses of San Marco, Venice, 1876, Whitney Museum of American Art
 Vesuvius from Pompeii, Detroit Institute of Arts
 The Vesuvius Eruption of 1906, date unknown, Brooklyn Museum
 Christ Walking on the Sea, Seaman's Institute
 Mural designs for the Church of St. Ignatius Loyola, New York City for the Ecclesiastical Department of the Tiffany Glass and Decorating Company.
 Quince Blossoms, 1878, Virginia Museum of Fine Arts

Gallery

References

External links

 

1840 births
1928 deaths
American expatriates in Italy
Artists from Buffalo, New York
19th-century American painters
American male painters
20th-century American painters
19th-century American male artists
20th-century American male artists
Painters from New York (state)